Sadiah Qureshi, FRHistS, is Senior Lecturer in modern history at the University of Birmingham. She is an expert on race, science and empire in the modern world.

Education 
Qureshi was awarded all of her degrees from the University of Cambridge .  Her DPhil (2005) thesis was entitled Living Curiosities: Human Ethnological Exhibitions in London, 1800-1855. She received her MPhil in 2001, and began her academic career with first-class honours degree in the Natural Sciences.

Career 
Following her DPhil, Qureshi held a postdoctoral research fellowship with the Cambridge Victorian Studies Group on a five-year Leverhulme funded project entitled ‘Past versus Present: Abandoning the Past in an Age of Progress’, which explored Victorian notions of the past. Qureshi joined the University of Birmingham in September 2011.

In 2013, her book, Peoples on Parade: Exhibitions, Empire and Anthropology in Nineteenth-Century Britain (2011) was joint winner of the Sonya Rudikoff Award for best first book published in Victorian Studies. In 2012, she was awarded a Philip Leverhulme Prize for Medieval, Early Modern and Modern History from the Leverhulme Trust in recognition of her outstanding research. Qureshi is working on the history of extinction for her second book, Vanished: Episodes in the History of Extinction. She received a mid-career fellowship from the British Academy for this project.

Qureshi is a Fellow of the Royal Historical Society. She contributed to the RHS's Race, Ethnicity & Equality Working Group to examine the challenges facing black and minority ethnic historians in UK higher education. Qureshi has contributed to media outlets such as the New Statesman, The Conversation and the London Review of Books.

Bibliography 

 Peoples on Parade: Exhibitions, Empire, and Anthropology in Nineteenth-Century Britain. 2011, University of Chicago Press.
 ''Star-Spangled Racism'' New Statesman, 2017, pp. 44–45. 
 ''We Prefer their Company'' London Review of Books, 2017, pp. 39–40.
 'Peopling the landscape: Showmen, displayed peoples and travel illustration in nineteenth-century Britain', Early Popular Visual Culture, 2012, vol. 10, no. 1, pp. 23–36.
 'Robert Gordon Latham, Displayed Peoples and the Natural History of Race, 1854-1866', The Historical Journal, vol. 54, no. 1, pp. 143–166.
 'Displaying Sara Baartman, the ‘Hottentot Venus’', History of Science, vol. 42, no. 2, pp. 233–257

See also 

 Human zoo, one of her areas of study
 Victorian era

References 

Alumni of the University of Cambridge
Academics of the University of Birmingham
British historians
Living people
Year of birth missing (living people)